The Brooklyn Latin School is a public specialized high school in New York City. It opened in September 2006. The ideals governing Brooklyn Latin are borrowed largely from the Boston Latin School, and popular society's ideals. The school’s founding headmaster was Jason Griffiths.  

Admission to Brooklyn Latin involves passing the Specialized High Schools Admissions Test. Each November, about 30,000 eighth and ninth graders take the 3-hour test for admittance to eight of the nine specialized high schools. Approximately 200 applicants are accepted each year. It is the second specialized high school in Brooklyn (along with Brooklyn Technical High School) and has the distinction of being the only specialized high school in which students adhere to a school uniform. The school color, purple, reflects the preference of Roman nobility, who wore robes dyed in that color and is also the school color of the Boston Latin School, another borrowed trait.

The school spent its first five years at 325 Bushwick Avenue, in limited space. In 2013 it moved to 223 Graham Avenue, not far from the previous school. In that same year it was named as one of New York State's top public schools.

Course of study

IB at TBLS
The Brooklyn Latin School is the only specialized high school in New York City that has implemented the IB Diploma Programme.

Enrollment
Admission to the Brooklyn Latin School is based exclusively on an entrance examination, known as the Specialized High Schools Admissions Test (SHSAT), open to all eighth and ninth grade New York City students. The test covers math (word problems and computation) and verbal (reading comprehension and grammar) skills. Out of the approximately 30,000 students taking the entrance examination for the September 2011 admission round (with 14,529 students listing Brooklyn Latin as a choice on their application), about 572 offers were made, making for an acceptance rate of 3.9%. 

In contrast to the other specialized high schools, Brooklyn Latin was known for its diversity in its early years.

See also
Roxbury Latin School
Boston Latin School

References

External links
 
 

Public high schools in Brooklyn
Educational institutions established in 2006
Specialized high schools in New York City
2006 establishments in New York City
Magnet schools in New York (state)
Bushwick, Brooklyn